Dombrücke may refer to:
 Cathedral Bridge, a road and rail bridge in Cologne, Germany from 1859 to 1909
 Tumski Bridge, a pedestrian bridge in Wrocław, Poland built in 1889